Brenden Richard Jefferson (June 3, 1986-February 2019) was an  American child film and television actor and songwriter. He played X-Ray in the film Holes.

Life and career
Born in San Bernardino, California, Jefferson was an only child.

He made various appearances in TV shows including The Parent 'Hood, The Steve Harvey Show, Even Stevens, Smart Guy, and the short-lived sitcom Thea, and is most notable for his role as Rex "X-Ray" Washburn in the 2003 Disney film, Holes. His most recent appearance was in the 2004 television movie Redemption: The Stanley Tookie Williams Story.

Little is known about the nature of his death or his life leading up to it, but Jefferson passed away in February of 2019 according to Facebook posts by people close to him. He was 32.

Filmography

Award nominations

References

External links

1986 births
Living people
Male actors from California
African-American male actors
American male film actors
American male television actors
Songwriters from California
American male child actors
Actors from San Bernardino, California
20th-century African-American people
21st-century African-American people